"Red Nation" is a 2011 song by The Game.

Red Nation may also refer to:

Red Nation (Namibia), the main subtribe of the Nama people of Namibia
Red Nation (magazine), Canadian online soccer magazine

See also
His Red Nation, or Little Crow (1810–1863), Dakota leader